Kuwait, officially the State of Kuwait, is a country in the northern edge of Eastern Arabia at the tip of the Persian Gulf.

Kuwait may also refer to:
 Kuwait City, capital of the State of Kuwait
 Kuwait SC, association football team in Kuwait City
 Kuwait SC (basketball), team in Kuwait City
 Qu'aiti, 1858–1967 sultanate in the Hadhramaut region of the southern Arabian Peninsula
 Sheikhdom of Kuwait, 1752–1961 predecessor of the State of Kuwait 
 Republic of Kuwait, August 1990 puppet state after the Iraqi invasion of Kuwait
 Kuwait Governorate, 1990–1991 administrative division of Iraq after its annexation of the Republic of Kuwait
 Kuwait (Kanso series), series of paintings by Nabil Kanso

See also
 Kuwaiti (disambiguation)